"Milky Way" is a song recorded by South Korean singer BoA from her third studio album, Atlantis Princess. The song was composed, written, and arranged by SM Entertainment songwriter Kenzie.

Release history

Red Velvet version 

"Milky Way" is a remake song recorded by South Korean girl group Red Velvet. It was originally recorded and released by soloist BoA on her 2003 Korean single "Double". Re-released and recorded by the group and released as their sixth digital single on August 21, 2020, it marks the first release as a group in 2020, with member Wendy, who was hospitalized after a stage accident.

The song is a part of their SM Station project, in celebration of BoA's 20th anniversary of her debut.

Background and composition 
On August 19, 2020, SM Entertainment announced that Red Velvet would be the fourth runner for SM Station 'Our Beloved BoA'. "Milky Way" was originally recorded and released by BoA in 2003 from her third Korean studio album Atlantis Princess. In addition, Wendy, who had a hiatus from group activities due to injury, participated in the song for the first time in about eight months.

Musically, "Milky Way" is described as a combination of "colorful acappella and jazz scat with harmonious vocals". The song is composed in the key of A♭ Major with a tempo of 98 beat-per-minute. The song was produced and written by Kenzie, who worked on the original song, and arranged the song himself to recreate it into a "fresh jazz pop" song. Lyrically, the song tells a story of unfolding a "dark night" with someone just like a "milky way".

Credits and personnel 
Credits adapted from Melon.

 Red Velvet (Irene, Seulgi, Wendy, Joy, Yeri) – vocals, background vocals
 Kenzie – background vocals
 Choi Hoon – bass
 Hong Joon-ho – guitar
 Song Young-joo – piano
 No Min-ji (SM Yellow Tail Studio) – recording engineer
 Lee Chang-sun (prelude studio) – recording engineer
 Jung Yu-ra – digital editing
 Kang Eun-ji (SM SSAM Studio) – mixing engineer
 Kim Chul-soon (SM Blue Ocean Studio) – mixing engineer
 Kwon Nam-woo (821 Sound Mastering) – mastering

Track listing

Charts

Release history

References 

2003 singles
2003 songs
2020 singles
2020 songs
Korean-language songs
Japanese-language songs
SM Entertainment singles
Songs written by Kenzie (songwriter)